The 32X is an add-on for the Sega Genesis video game console. Codenamed "Project Mars", it was designed to expand the power of the Genesis and serve as a transitional console into the 32-bit era until the release of the Sega Saturn. The 32X uses its own ROM cartridges and has its own library of games. It was distributed under the name  in Japan and South Korea, Genesis 32X in North America, Mega 32X in Brazil, and Mega Drive 32X in all other regions. 

Sega unveiled the 32X at the Consumer Electronics Show in June 1994, and presented it as a low-cost option for 32-bit games. It was developed in response to the Atari Jaguar and concerns that the Saturn would not make it to market by the end of 1994. Though the 32X was conceived as a new, standalone console, at the suggestion of Sega of America executive Joe Miller and his team, it became an add-on for the Genesis and made more powerful. The final design contained two 32-bit central processing units and a visual display processor.  

The 32X failed to attract third-party video game developers and consumers because of the announcement of the Saturn's simultaneous release in Japan. Sega's efforts to rush the 32X to market cut into time for game development, resulting in a weak library of 40 games that did not fully use the hardware, including Genesis ports. Sega produced 800,000 32X units and sold an estimated 665,000 by the end of 1994, selling the rest at steep discounts until it was discontinued in 1996 as Sega turned its focus to the Saturn. 

The 32X is considered a commercial failure. Initial reception was positive, highlighting the low price and power expansion to the Genesis. However, later reviews, both contemporary and retrospective, were mostly negative because of its shallow game library, poor market timing and its market fragmentation of the Genesis.

History
Sega released the Mega Drive, a 16-bit video game console, in 1988. It was released in North America as the Genesis in 1989, with releases in other regions a year later. In 1991, Sega released an add-on for the Genesis, the Sega CD, which did not meet commercial expectations. Sega began to develop a second add-on that would bridge the gap between the Genesis and its upcoming Sega Saturn, serving as a less expensive entry into the 32-bit era. Sega was determined to release the new add-on before the end of 1994. According to former Sega of America CEO Tom Kalinske, "Initially, the argument was that we could get another year of life out of the Genesis before we had to introduce the Saturn.  Japan disagreed with me on that, so as kind of a stopgap measure, the 32X came up."

Development
During the Winter Consumer Electronics Show in January 1994, Sega of America research and development head Joe Miller took a phone call in his Las Vegas hotel suite from Sega president Hayao Nakayama, in which Nakayama stressed the importance of coming up with a quick response to the Atari Jaguar.  Included on this call were Sega of America producer Scot Bayless, Sega hardware team head Hideki Sato, and Sega of America vice president of technology Marty Franz.  One potential idea for this came from a concept from the Japanese team.  This concept, later known as "Project Jupiter" and referred to by former Sega of America producer Michael Latham as "Genesis 2", was an entirely new independent console.  Project Jupiter was initially slated to be a new version of the Genesis, with an upgraded color palette and a lower cost than the upcoming Saturn, as well as with some limited 3D capabilities thanks to integration of ideas from the development of the Sega Virtua Processor chip.  Miller pushed for a different strategy—according to Latham, Miller dismissed Project Jupiter as "just a horrible idea.  If all you're going to do is enhance the system, you should make it an add-on.  If it's a new system with legitimate new software, great.  But if the only thing it does is double the colors...."  Miller said his idea was to leverage the existing Genesis as a way to keep from alienating Sega customers, who would otherwise be required to discard their Genesis systems entirely to play 32-bit games, and to control the cost of the new system in the form of an add-on.  From these discussions, Project Jupiter was discontinued and the new add-on, codenamed "Project Mars", was advanced.

At the suggestion from Miller that his American team would be able to design the system, the 32X was designed as a peripheral for the existing Genesis, expanding its power with two 32-bit SuperH-2 processors, the same as those that would be used in the Saturn but with a lower clock speed. The SH-2 had been developed in 1993 as a joint venture between Sega and Japanese electronics company Hitachi. The original design for the 32X add-on, according to Bayless, was created on a cocktail napkin, but Miller denied this. In another account, Bayless claimed that Franz began designing the 32X on a hotel notepad, drawing two SH-2 processors with separate framebuffers. 

Although the new unit was a stronger console than originally proposed, it was not compatible with Saturn games. This was justified by Sega's statement that both platforms would run at the same time, and that the 32X would be aimed at players who could not afford the more expensive Saturn. Bayless praised the potential of this system at this point, calling it "a coder's dream for the day" with its twin processors and 3D capabilities. Sega of America headed up the development of the 32X, with some assistance from Sato's team in Japan.  Shortages of processors due to the same 32-bit chips being used in both the 32X and the Saturn hindered the development of the 32X, as did the language barrier between the teams in Japan and the United States.

Before the 32X was launched, the release date of the Saturn was announced for November 1994 in Japan, coinciding with the 32X's target launch date in North America.  Sega of America was tasked with marketing the 32X with the Saturn's Japan release occurring simultaneously.  Their answer was to describe the 32X a "transitional device" between the Genesis and the Saturn; Bayless said this "just made us look greedy and dumb to consumers".

Promotion and release

The unveiling of the 32X to the public came at the Summer Consumer Electronics Show in June 1994 in Chicago.  Promoted as the "poor man's entry into 'next generation' games", 32X was marketed for its US$159 price point as a less-expensive alternative to the Saturn.  However, Sega would not answer as to whether or not a Genesis console equipped with a Sega CD and a 32X would be able to run Saturn software.  Trip Hawkins, founder of The 3DO Company, was willing to point out that it would not, stating, "Everyone knows that 32X is a Band-Aid.  It's not a 'next generation system.'  It's fairly expensive.  It's not particularly high-performance.  It's hard to program for, and it's not compatible with the Saturn."  In response to these comments, Sega executive Richard Brudvik-Lindner pointed out that the 32X would play Genesis games, and had the same system architecture as the Saturn.

In August of that year, GamePro highlighted the advantages of the upcoming add-on in its 32-bit processors and significantly lower price, noting that "[n]o doubt gotta-get-it-now gamers will spend the big bucks to grab Saturn or PlayStation systems and games from Japan.  For the rest of us, however, 32X may well be the system of choice in '94."  In promotion for the new system, Sega promised 12 games available at launch and 50 games due for release in 1995 from third-party developers.

The 32X was released on November 21, 1994, in North America, in time for the holiday season that year.  As announced, it retailed for $159.99, and had a reasonably successful launch in the marketplace.  Demand among retailers was high, and Sega could not keep up with orders for the new system.  Over 1,000,000 orders had been placed for 32X units, but Sega had only managed to ship 600,000 units by January 1995. In the United States, nearly 500,000 units were sold by Christmas 1994, exceeding Sega's initial sales projection. Launching at about the same price as a Genesis console, the price of the 32X was less than half of what the Saturn's price would be at launch. Despite Sega's initial promises, only six games were available at its North American launch, including Doom, Star Wars Arcade, Virtua Racing Deluxe, and Cosmic Carnage. Although Virtua Racing was considered strong, Cosmic Carnage "looked and played so poorly that reporters made jokes about it".  Games were available at a retail price of $69.95.  Advertising for the system included images of the 32X being connected to a Genesis console to create an "arcade system".  Japan received the 32X on December 3, 1994.  The PAL release came in January 1995, at a price of £169.99, and also experienced initial high demand.

Decline
Despite the lower price console's positioning as an inexpensive entry into 32-bit gaming, Sega had a difficult time convincing third-party developers to create games for the new system.  Top developers were already aware of the coming arrival of the Sega Saturn, Nintendo 64, and PlayStation, and did not believe the 32X would be capable of competing with any of those systems. The quick development time of the 32X also made game development difficult, according to Franz.  Not wanting to create games for an add-on that was "a technological dead-end", many developers decided not to make games for the system.  Problems plagued games developed in-house due to the time crunch to release the 32X.  According to Bayless, "games in the queue were effectively jammed into a box as fast as possible, which meant massive cutting of corners in every conceivable way.  Even from the outset, designs of those games were deliberately conservative because of the time crunch.  By the time they shipped they were even more conservative; they did nothing to show off what the hardware was capable of." Kalinske has stated that Sega of America did not receive enough support from Japan in game development. Development kits came out very late, leaving little time for game development before the 32X release.

Journalists were similarly concerned about Sega's tactic of selling two similar consoles at different prices and attempting to support both, likening Sega's approach to that of General Motors and segmenting the market for its consoles. In order to convince the press that the 32X was a worthwhile console, Sega flew in journalists from all around the country to San Francisco for a party at a local nightclub. The event featured a speech from Kalinske, live music with a local rapper praising the 32X, and 32X games on exhibition. However, the event turned out to be a bust, as journalists attempted to leave the party due to its loud music and unimpressive games on display, only to find that the buses that brought them to the nightclub had just left and would not return until the scheduled end of the party.

Though the system had a successful launch, demand soon disappeared. Over the first three months of 1995, several of the 32X's third party publishers, including Capcom and Konami, cancelled their 32X projects so that they could focus on producing games for the Saturn and PlayStation. The 32X failed to catch on with the public, and is considered a commercial failure.  By 1995, the Genesis had still not proven successful in Japan, where it was known as Mega Drive, and the Saturn was beating the PlayStation, so Sega CEO Hayao Nakayama decided to force Sega of America to focus on the Saturn and cut support for Genesis products, executing a surprise early launch of the Saturn in the early summer of 1995.  Sega was supporting five different consoles before this—Saturn, Genesis, Game Gear, Pico, and the Master System—as well as the Sega CD and Sega 32X add-ons.  Sales estimates for the 32X stood at 665,000 units at the end of 1994.  Despite assurances from Sega that many games would be developed for the system, in early 1996, Sega finally conceded that it had promised too much out of the add-on and decided to discontinue the 32X in order to focus on the Saturn. In September 1995, the retail price for the 32X dropped to $99, and later the remaining inventory was cleared out of stores at $19.95, with 800,000 units sold in total.

Sega Neptune
The Sega Neptune is an unproduced two-in-one Genesis and 32X console which Sega planned to release in fall 1995, with the retail price planned to be under $200. It was featured as early as March 1995, with Sega Magazine saying the console "shows [Sega's] commitment to the hardware", and that the system would be compatible with the Mega-CD. Sega cancelled the Neptune in October 1995, citing fears that it would dilute their marketing for the Saturn while being priced too close to the Saturn to be a viable competitor. Electronic Gaming Monthly used the Sega Neptune as an April Fools' Day prank in its April 2001 issue. The issue included a small article in which the writers announced that Sega had found a warehouse full of old Sega Neptunes, and were selling them on a website for $199.

Technical aspects and specifications

The 32X can be used only in conjunction with a Genesis system.  It is inserted into the system like a standard game cartridge.  The add-on requires its own separate power supply, a connection cable linking it to the Genesis, and an additional conversion cable for the original model of the Genesis.  As well as playing its own library of cartridges, the 32X is backwards-compatible with Genesis games, and can also be used in conjunction with the Sega CD to play games that use both add-ons.  The 32X also came with a spacer so it would fit properly with the second model of the Genesis; an optional spacer was offered for use with the Sega Genesis CDX system, but ultimately never shipped due to risks of electric shock when the 32X and CDX were connected.  Installation of the 32X also requires the insertion of two included electromagnetic shield plates into the Genesis' cartridge slot.

Seated on top of a Genesis, the 32X measures .  The 32X contains two Hitachi SH-2 32-bit RISC processors with a clock speed of 23 MHz, which Sega claimed would allow the system to work 40 times faster than a stand-alone Genesis. Its graphics processing unit is capable of producing 32,768 colors and rendering 50,000 polygons per second, which provides a noticeable improvement over the polygon rendering of the Genesis.  The 32X also includes 256 kilobytes of random-access memory (RAM), along with 256 kilobytes of video RAM.  Sound is supplied through a pulse-width modulation sound source.  Input/output is supplied to a television set via a provided A/V cable that supplies composite video and stereo audio, or through an RF modulator. Stereo audio can also be played through headphones via a headphone jack on the attached Genesis.

Game library

The 32X library consists of 40 games, including six that required both the 32X and Sega CD. Among them were ports of arcade games After Burner, Space Harrier, and Star Wars Arcade, a sidescroller with a hummingbird as a main character in Kolibri, and a 32X-exclusive Sonic the Hedgehog spinoff, Knuckles' Chaotix. Several of the games released for the 32X are enhanced ports of Genesis games, including NFL Quarterback Club and World Series Baseball '95. In a retrospective review of the console, Star Wars Arcade was considered the best game for the 32X by IGN for its cooperative play, soundtrack, and faithful reproduction of the experiences of Star Wars. In a separate review, IGNs Levi Buchanan praised the 32X game Shadow Squadron as superior to Star Wars Arcade. Retro Gamer writer Damien McFerran, however, praised Virtua Fighter as "the jewel in the 32X's crown", and GamesRadar+ named Knuckles' Chaotix as the best game for the system. Next Generation called Virtua Fighter "the colorful wreath on 32X's coffin",  reflecting the consensus among contemporary critics that the game was at once arguably the 32X's best release and a clear harbinger of the platform's imminent discontinuation, since it was inferior to the already-released Saturn version of Virtua Fighter Remix, as well as the forthcoming Saturn release of Virtua Fighter 2. In response to fan inquiries, Sega stated that the 32X architecture was not powerful enough to handle a port of Virtua Fighter 2.

Despite its 32-bit processing and potential for better graphics and sound than the Genesis, most games did not take advantage of the 32X hardware. Doom for the 32X received near-perfect reviews, but was later criticized as inferior to versions for the PC and the Atari Jaguar, with missing levels, poor graphics and audio, jerky movement, and windowed gameplay. Franz believes few developers were willing to invest in designing games to work with the 32X's improved audio abilities.  One cause was the rush to release games for the 32X launch; former Sega of America executive producer Michael Latham said it took "a lot of convincing" to release the 32X launch game Cosmic Carnage. With Doom, id Software programmer John Carmack had to cut a third of the levels to have the game ready for the 32X launch.  Because of time limitations, game designs were intentionally conservative and did not show what the 32X hardware was able to do. In an interview at the end of 1995, Sega vice president of marketing Mike Ribero insisted that Sega was not abandoning the 32X, but acknowledged that first-party support had been lackluster: "I won't lie to you, we screwed up with 32X. We overpromised and underdelivered."

Reception and legacy

Initial reception to the 32X and its games upon the launch of the add-on was very positive. Four reviewers from Electronic Gaming Monthly scored the add-on 8, 7, 8, and 8 out of 10 in their 1995 Buyer's Guide, highlighting the add-on's enhancements to the Genesis but questioning how long the system would be supported. GamePro commented that the 32X's multiple input and power cords make it "as complicated as setting up your VCR" and noted some performance glitches with the prototype such as freezes and overheating, but expressed confidence that the production models would perform well and gave the add-on their overall approval. Reviews of its launch games, such as Doom, were likewise positive.

By late 1995, feedback to the add-on had soured. In its 1996 Buyer's Guide, Electronic Gaming Monthly'''s four reviewers scored the add-on 3, 3, 3, and 2 out of 10, criticizing the game library and Sega's abandonment of the system in favor of the Saturn. A review in Next Generation panned the 32X for its weak polygon processing, the tendency of developers to show off its capabilities with garishly colored games, and its apparent function as "simply a way of grabbing extra 1994 mind and market share while waiting for Saturn". The review gave it one out of five stars. Game Players assessed it as so much less powerful than the Saturn and PlayStation that its lower price could not be considered an enticement, and said that the vast majority of its games could have been done just as well on the Super NES. Additionally commenting that both first party and third party software support had been weak, they concluded, "The lack of support [and] good games, and the release of Saturn make the 32X a system that never was."

Retrospectively, the 32X is widely criticized as having a shallow library with a lack of support and a poor idea in the wake of the release of the Sega Saturn in Japan.  1UP.com's Jeremy Parish stated that the 32X "tainted just about everything it touched."  GamesRadar+ also panned the system, placing it as their ninth-worst console with reviewer Mikel Reparaz criticizing that "it was a stopgap system that would be thrown under the bus when the Sega Saturn came out six months later, and everyone seemed to know it except for die-hard Sega fans and the company itself."  Retro Gamer's Damien McFerran offered some praise for the power increase of the 32X to offer ports of Space Harrier, After Burner, and Virtua Fighter that were accurate to the original arcade versions, as well as the add-on's price point, stating, "If you didn't have deep enough pockets to afford a Saturn, then the 32X was a viable option; it's just a shame that it sold so poorly because the potential was there for true greatness."  Levi Buchanan, writing for IGN, saw some sense in the move for Sega to create the 32X but criticized its implementation.  According to Buchanan, "I actually thought the 32X was a better idea than the SEGA CD... The 32X, while underpowered, at least advanced the ball. Maybe it only gained a few inches in no small part due to a weak library, but at least the idea was the right one."

In particular, the console's status as an add-on and poor timing after the announcement of the Saturn has been identified by reviewers as being responsible factors for fracturing the audience for Sega's video game consoles in terms of both developers and consumers.  Allgame's Scott Alan Marriott states that "[e]very add-on whittled away at the number of potential buyers and discouraged third-party companies from making the games necessary to boost sales."  GamePro criticized the concept of the add-on, noting the expenses involved in purchasing the system.  According to reviewer Blake Snow, "Just how many 16-bit attachments did one need? All in all, if you were one of the unlucky souls who completely bought into Sega's add-on frenzy, you would have spent a whopping $650 for something that weighed about as much as a small dog."  Writing for GamesRadar+, Reparaz noted that "developers—not wanting to waste time on a technological dead-end—abandoned the 32X in droves. Gamers quickly followed suit, turning what was once a promising idea into an embarrassing footnote in console history, as well as an object lesson in why console makers shouldn't split their user base with pricey add-ons."  Reparaz went on to criticize Sega's decision to release the 32X, noting that "(u)ltimately, the 32X was the product of boneheaded short-sightedness: its existence put Sega into competition with itself once the Saturn rolled out."  Writing for IGN'', Buchanan points out, "Notice that we haven't seen many add-ons like the 32X since 1994? I think the 32X killed the idea of an add-on like this—a power booster—permanently. And that's a good thing. Because add-ons, if not implemented properly, just splinter an audience."

Former executives at Sega have mixed opinions of the 32X.  Bayless believes firmly that the 32X serves as a warning to the video game industry not to risk splintering the market for consoles by creating add-ons, and was critical of the Kinect and PlayStation Move for doing so.  Franz places the 32X's commercial failure on its inability to function without an attached Genesis and lack of a CD drive, despite its compatibility with the Sega CD, stating, "The 32X was destined to die because it didn't have a CD drive and was an add-on.  An add-on device is never as well thought out as a built-from-scratch device."  Miller, on the other hand, remembers the 32X positively, stating, "I think the 32X actually was an interesting, viable platform. The timing was wrong, and certainly our ability to stick with it, given what we did with Saturn, was severely limited. There were a whole bunch of reasons why we couldn’t ultimately do what we had to do with that platform, without third party support and with the timing of Saturn, but I still think the project was a success for a bunch of other reasons. In hindsight, it was not a great idea for a whole bunch of other reasons."

See also

 3DO Interactive Multiplayer
 Philips CD-i

Notes

References

Fifth-generation video game consoles
Products introduced in 1994
Products introduced in 1995
1990s toys
Products and services discontinued in 1996
32X
Video game console add-ons
Repurposing
SuperH-based game consoles